UPD may refer to:

Political parties
 Union for Development, a political party in Macao
 Union for Peace and Development, a political party in Burundi
 Union, Progress and Democracy, a political party in Spain

Science and technology
 Underpotential deposition, electrodeposition of a metal
 Uniparental disomy, chromosomal abnormality
 HP Universal Print Driver, LaserJet print driver by Hewlett-Packard

Other
 Unified Police Department of Greater Salt Lake
 Urban planned development, a governmental designation for an urban village-style planned community
 University of the Philippines Diliman, the flagship university of the University of the Philippines System
 University Police Department, on-campus police force at a university

Disambiguation pages